Chakar Ali Khan Junejo (5 December 1928 – 31 October 1997) was Ambassador of Pakistan to the United Arab Emirates and a MPA. Khan was born in a Sindhi Junejo Muslim family.

Career 
Junejo was a close associate of Zulfikar Ali Bhutto, who became prime minister of Pakistan. The association started in early 1950s during student life in London and continued as the Pakistan Peoples Party emerged as the party of the masses in Pakistan. He was a member of a prominent land-owning Junejo family of Larkana, stood up to coercive pressures of the dictator, Muhammad Zia-ul-Haq, enduring political arrests including solitary confinement, for his friend and the party.

He was the Author of "Zulfikar Ali Bhutto: A Memoir".

Notes

1928 births
1997 deaths
Sindhi people
Ambassadors of Pakistan to the United Arab Emirates